Kusunovo is a rural locality (a selo) in Vladimir, Vladimir Oblast, Russia. The population was 64 as of 2010. There are 5 streets.

Geography 
Kusunovo is located 12 km southeast of Vladimir. Uvarovo is the nearest rural locality.

References 

Rural localities in Vladimir Urban Okrug
Vladimirsky Uyezd